Shahina K. K., alternatively KK Shahina or Shahina Nafeesa, is an Indian journalist who is a Senior Editor Outlook Magazine, and a contributor for The Washington Post. She was conferred with the Chameli Devi Jain Award for Outstanding Women Mediapersons in 2011. She is also a participant as an activist in the Kiss of Love movement against moral policing in India. Based in the state of Kerala, she is frequently cited by various mainstream media networks on issues related to gender equality and women's rights.

Shahina was associated with OPEN magazine between 2011–2020, was a former correspondent of Tehelka magazine, and began her career as an Asianet News reporter.

She was arrested through the Unlawful Activities (Prevention) Act for reporting on police misconduct in an investigation in the state of Karnataka, been subjected to anonymous rape threats, and false reporting by the Bharatiya Janata Party affiliated newspaper Janmabhumi that she was an accused in a bomb blast case.

References

Living people
Indian women editors
Indian journalists
Year of birth missing (living people)